Blaricum is a municipality and village in the province of North Holland, the Netherlands. It is part of the region of Gooiland and part of the Amsterdam Metropolitan Area (Metropoolregio Amsterdam). It is known for its many monumental farm buildings, local cafes and restaurants, nature, several annual community events, and extensive up-market residential areas.

According to statistics published by the Dutch land registry office in February 2011, Blaricum is the most expensive location to purchase a house in the Netherlands. The average home in Blaricum costs €800,000 and had risen an average of 12% from the previous year. 

Blaricum is a popular residence of many Dutch celebrities, including Rene Froger, Anita Meijer, Paul de Leeuw, Dennis Bergkamp, Gordon, Jerney Kaagman, John de Mol, Anita Witzier and Marco Borsato.

Districts
The municipality of Blaricum consists of the following districts:

Topography 

Dutch Topographic map of the municipality of Blaricum, June 2015.

Local government
The municipal council of Blaricum consists of 13 seats, which are divided as follows:

History
In Blaricum was located the Tolstoyan community De International Broederschap 1900–1903.

Notable people 

 Mellie Uyldert (1908 in Blaricum – 2009) a female Dutch New Age writer, alternative healer, occultist, and astrologer
 Max Croiset (1912 in Blaricum – 1993) a Dutch actor 
 Dick Bakker (born 1947 in Blaricum) a Dutch composer, conductor and music producer 
 Merel Bechtold (born 1992 in Blaricum) a guitarist

Sport 
 Ton Richter (1919 in Blaricum – 2009) a Dutch field hockey player, team bronze medallist at the 1948 Summer Olympics
 Robert-Jan Derksen (born 1974) a Dutch professional golfer, lives in Blaricum
 Selena Piek (born 1991 in Blaricum) a Dutch badminton player, team gold medalist at the 2019 European Games

Gallery

References

External links

Official website

 
Municipalities of North Holland
Populated places in North Holland